Theodore P. Savas is a licensed attorney, former adjunct college instructor, entrepreneur, award-winning author, and publisher. He is the co-founder and majority partner of Savas Beatie, an award-winning independent book trade publishing company that specializes in military and general history, and especially the American Civil War. He writes and speaks about Civil War topics, as well as the American Revolutionary War, and WWII German U-boats.

Background
Savas was born and raised on the Northern Plains in Iowa. He graduated from North Iowa Area Community College (NIACC) in 1979, A.A. degree, and from the University of Northern Iowa (UNI) in 1981, B.A. History. He received his teaching credentials. After working on his Master's in American History, he entered The University of Iowa College of Law in 1983 and graduated in 1986 (with Distinction).

Career
Savas practiced law in Silicon Valley for twelve years before becoming a full-time publisher and writer. In 1990, he and David A. Woodbury started the publishing company Regimental Studies, Inc., which became Savas Woodbury Publishers. Savas and Woodbury co-founded the quarterly journal Civil War Regiments, which produced 25 quarterly issues. Savas Woodbury became Savas Publishing in 1995, after which Savas added the Journal of the Indian Wars, which published five issues. In 2000-2001, Savas Publishing was sold into a merger deal with Combined Publishing of Conshohocken, PA, and Perseus Books Group of Boston and NY.

From 1992 until 2009, Savas taught legal, historical, political, and business-related college classes as an adjunct lecturer in the Bay Area and Sacramento region. Savas and the late New York-based attorney Russell H. Beatie founded the military publishing house Savas Beatie LLC in 2004, with Savas serving as its managing director in El Dorado Hills, CA.

In addition to founding (with David Woodbury) The South Bay Civil War Roundtable in 1989, Savas enlisted Paul Sacra of Richmond, Virginia, to map the Civil War battlefield of Payne's Farm (part of the late Fall 1863 Mine Run Campaign), in Orange County, Virginia. Savas thought that modern sources had improperly located the field and that the units involved were ill-positioned. Savas turned the maps and information over to a Fredericksburg-based preservation organization. This, in turn, prompted increased interest in both the battle and the battlefield, and eventually led to the land being preserved and interpreted.

Savas was part of Clive Cussler's expedition in 1994-1995 that found the Confederate submarine CSS Hunley off Charleston, South Carolina.

In addition to writing articles on a variety of historical topics and penning a regular column for a local newspaper, Savas has written, edited, or co-authored a dozen books (published in seven languages), and has ghostwritten nearly forty others.

He is a regular guest on podcasts, online forum presentations, and in-person lectures, and offers the online class Write NOW! to help aspiring and veteran authors get on track, stay on track, and get published.   

Savas is married and lives in northern California. He has two children.

Books
Savas (1993) The Campaign for Atlanta & Sherman's March to the Sea vol. 1., with David A. Woodbury, ed.
 Savas (1994) The Campaign for Atlanta & Sherman's March to the Sea vol. 2., with David A. Woodbury, ed.
 Savas (1994) The Campaign for Atlanta & Sherman's March to the Sea vols. 1-2 (combined)., with David A. Woodbury, ed.
 Savas (1996) Blood on the Rappahannock: The Battle of Fredericksburg (Civil War Regiments: A Journal of the American Civil War, Volume 4, No. 4)
 Savas (1997, 2003) Silent Hunters: German U-boat Commanders of World War II
 Savas (1997) Charleston : Battles and Seacoast Operations in South Carolina, Civil War Regiments: A Journal of the American Civil War, Volume 5, No. 2)
 Savas (2000) Chickamauga & Chattanooga: Battles for the Confederate Heartland. (Civil War Regiments: A Journal of the American Civil War, Volume 7, No 1)
 Savas (2002) Nazi Millionaires: The Allied Search for Hidden SS Gold, with co-author Kenneth D. Alford
 Savas (2004) Hunt and Kill: U-505 and the U-Boat War in the Atlantic, editor
 Savas (2006) A Guide to the Battles of the American Revolution, with co-author J. David Dameron
 Savas (2007) Never for Want of Powder: The Confederate Powder Works in Augusta, Georgia, with co-authors C. L. Bragg, Gordon A. Blaker, Charles D. Ross, and Stephanie A. T. Jacobe
 Savas (2008) Brady's Civil War Journal: Photographing the War 1861-1865 Skyhorse Publishing.
 Savas (2010) The New American Revolution Handbook: Facts and Artwork for Readers of all Ages, 1775-1783, with co-author J. David Dameron)
Savas (2017) The War's Biggest Blunder: Sherman and the Bypassing of Augusta on the March to the Sea. Aug 2017 in Civil War Times Magazine
Savas (2017) "Heartbeat of the Southern War Machine: The Augusta Powder Works." June 2017 in Civil War Times Magazine

Articles
Savas (2018) "AN ELEGANT GAME: The A Dying Southern Diarist, the Civil War, and his Fascination with Chess," in American Chess Magazine (Aug. 1, 2018).
Savas (2017) "The War's Biggest Blunder: Sherman and the Bypassing of Augusta on the March to the Sea," in Civil War Times Magazine (Aug. 1, 2017).
Savas (2017) "The Heart of the Confederate War Machine: The Augusta Powder Works," in Civil War Times Magazine (June 1, 2017).
Savas (2016) "The Business of History Books: An Interview with Theodore P. Savas" in The Civil War Monitor (July 2016).
Savas (1999) "Gauntlet of Fire: The USS Wyoming in the Shimonoseki Straits," in Naval History Magazine (Feb. 1, 1999).
Savas (1992)"The Battle of Payne's Farm, Nov. 27, 1863," in Civil War: The Magazine of the Civil War Society (May 1, 1992).
Savas (1991) "Bulwark of the Beleaguered Confederacy: The Augusta Powder Works," in Civil War: The Magazine of the Civil War Society (Sept. 1, 1991).
Savas (1991) "Foraging South of the James River: The Suffolk Campaign," in Confederate Veteran Magazine (March 1, 1991).
Savas (1990) "Longstreet Takes Command: The Suffolk Campaign," America's Civil War (March 1, 1990).
Savas (1989) "Last Clash of the Ironclads: The Bungled Affair in Trent's Reach," in Civil War: The Magazine of the Civil War Society (Jan. 1, 1989)
Savas (1988) Ironclads on the James River: The Battle of Trent's Reach," in Confederate Veteran Magazine (Nov. 1, 1988).

Awards
 A Guide to the Battles of the American Revolution: Winner, 2006, Gold Star Book Award for History, Military Writers Society of America. A selection of the History and Military book clubs.
 The New American Revolution Handbook: Winner, Reference, 2010 Army Historical Foundation Distinguished Book Award
 Never for Want of Powder: The Confederate Powder Works in Augusta, Georgia, with co-authors C. L. Bragg, Gordon A. Blaker, Charles D. Ross, and Stephanie A. T. Jacobe): Winner 2007 Lilla M. Hawes Award, Georgia Historical Society.
 The Iron Brigade Award for Civil War Scholarship, from The Milwaukee Civil War Round Table, Sept. 2020.

References

External links
 Theodore P. Savas at Savas Beatie
 A Publisher's Perspective blog at Savas Beatie
 

Living people
American publishers (people)
American male writers
Year of birth missing (living people)